Pseudolucinisca is a genus of bivalves in the subfamily Leucosphaerinae belonging to the family Lucinidae.

Species
 Pseudolucinisca japonica (Habe, 1958)
 Pseudolucinisca kantori Glover & J. D. Taylor, 2016
 Pseudolucinisca lacteola (Tate, 1897)
 Pseudolucinisca wami Glover & J. D. Taylor, 2008

References

 Taylor J. & Glover E. (2021). Biology, evolution and generic review of the chemosymbiotic bivalve family Lucinidae. London: The Ray Society [Publication 182]. 319 pp.

External links
 

Lucinidae
Bivalve genera